Arablinski is an Azerbaijani surname. Notable people with the surname include:

Balakishi Arablinski (1828–1902), Azerbaijani general
Huseyn Arablinski (1881–1919), Azerbaijani actor

Azerbaijani-language surnames